Queen of Soul: The Atlantic Recordings is an 86-track, four-disc box set detailing Aretha Franklin's Atlantic career, starting in 1967 with the landmark single "I Never Loved a Man (The Way I Love You)" and ending with 1976's "Something He Can Feel".

Background
The set highlights Franklin's best moments and give a depth that is essential to the Queen's and soul music fans, but does not include any tracks recorded by Aretha for Atlantic after 1977. The liner notes include essays written for the box set by producers Jerry Wexler, Arif Mardin, and Tom Dowd, as well as contributors Ahmet Ertegun, Dave Marsh, David Ritz, and Thulani Davis. The album won a Grammy Award for Best Album Notes at the 35th Annual Grammy Awards, the first win in the category by a woman (Davis).

This release by Atlantic Records should not be confused with the February 2014 release by Rhino Records entitled The Queen of Soul. Both are 4-CD compilations. They share 75 tracks. The Atlantic release, however, contains 11 tracks not on the Rhino release, and the Rhino release has an additional 12 tracks not found on the Atlantic release.

As of 2003, sales in the United States have exceeded 72,000 copies, according to Nielsen SoundScan.

Track listing

1992 Atlantic Records release

{{Track listing
| collapsed       = yes
| headline        = Volume Two
| extra_column    = From album

| title1          = Think
| extra1          = Aretha Now
| length1         =

| title2          = See Saw
| extra2          = Aretha Now
| length2         =

| title3          = The House That Jack Built
| extra3          = non album single (#45-2546)
| length3         =

| title4          = Night Time Is the Right Time
| extra4          = Aretha Now'
| length4         =

| title5          = I Say a Little Prayer
| extra5          = Aretha Now| length5         =

| title6          = You Send Me
| extra6          = Aretha Now| length6         =

| title7          = My Song
| extra7          = B-side to "See Saw"
| length7         =

| title8          = I Take What I Want
| extra8          = Aretha Now| length8         =

| title9          = I Can't See Myself Leaving You
| extra9          = Aretha Now| length9         =

| title10         = Night Life
| note10          = Live, 1968
| extra10         = Aretha In Paris| length10        =

| title11         = Today I Sing the Blues
| extra11         = Soul '69| length11        =

| title12         = Pitiful
| extra12         = Soul '69| length12        =

| title13         = Tracks of My Tears
| extra13         = Soul '69| length13        =

| title14         = River's Invitation
| extra14         = Soul '69| length14        =

| title15         = Share Your Love with Me
| extra15         = This Girl's in Love with You| length15        =

| title16         = It Ain't Fair
| extra16         = This Girl's in Love with You| length16        =

| title17         = Sit Down and Cry
| extra17         = This Girl's in Love with You| length17        =

| title18         = Honest I Do
| extra18         = Spirit in the Dark| length18        =

| title19         = The Weight
| extra19         = This Girl's in Love with You| length19        =

| title20         = When the Battle Is Over
| extra20         = Spirit in the Dark| length20        =

| title21         = Eleanor Rigby
| extra21         = This Girl's in Love with You| length21        =

| title22         = One Way Ticket
| extra22         = Spirit in the Dark| length22        =

| title23         = Call Me
| extra23         = This Girl's in Love with You| length23        =

| title24         = Pullin
| extra24         = Spirit in the Dark| length24        = 
}}

2014 Rhino Records release
Disc 1
 "I Never Loved a Man (The Way I Love You)"
 "Do Right Woman, Do Right Man"
 "Respect"
 "Drown in My Own Tears"
 "Soul Serenade"
 "Don't Let Me Lose This Dream"
 "Baby, Baby, Baby"
 "Dr. Feelgood (Love Is a Serious Business)" 
 "Good Times"
 "Save Me" 
 "Baby, I Love You"
 "Satisfaction"
 "You Are My Sunshine" 
 "Never Let Me Go" 
 "Prove It"
 "I Wonder"
 "Ain't Nobody (Gonna Turn Me Around)"
 "It Was You" (Aretha Arrives outtake)
 "(You Make Me Feel Like) A Natural Woman" 
 "Chain of Fools"
 "People Get Ready" 
 "Come Back Baby"
 "Good to Me as I Am to You"
 "(Sweet Sweet Baby) Since You've Been Gone"
 "Ain't No Way"

Disc 2
 "Think"
 "You Send Me"
 "I Say a Little Prayer"
 "The House That Jack Built"
 "You're a Sweet Sweet Man"
 "I Take What I Want"
 "A Change"
 "See Saw"
 "My Song"
 "I Can't See Myself Leaving You"
 "Night Life" (live)
 "Ramblin'"
 "Today I Sing the Blues"
 "River's Invitation"
 "Pitiful"
 "Talk to Me, Talk to Me" (Soul '69 outtake)
 "Tracks of My Tears"
 "The Weight"
 "Share Your Love with Me"
 "Pledging My Love / The Clock"
 "It Ain't Fair"
 "Sit Down and Cry"
 "Let It Be"
 "Eleanor Rigby"
 "Call Me"

Disc 3
 "Son of a Preacher Man"
 "Try Matty's"
 "The Thrill Is Gone (From Yesterday's Kiss)"
 "Dark End of the Street"
 "You and Me"
 "You're Taking Up Another Man's Place" (Spirit in the Dark outtake)
 "Don't Play That Song"
 "Why I Sing the Blues"
 "Spirit in the Dark"
 "My Way" (Spirit in the Dark'' outtake)
 "One Way Ticket"
 "Pullin'"
 "Border Song (Holy Moses)"
 "A Brand New Me"
 "You're All I Need to Get By"
 "Bridge Over Troubled Water"
 "Spanish Harlem"
 "Lean on Me"
 "Spirit in the Dark" (Reprise With Ray Charles) (Live, 1971)

Disc 4
 "Rock Steady"
 "Young, Gifted and Black"
 "All the King's Horses"
 "Oh Me Oh My (I'm a Fool for You Baby)"
 "Day Dreaming"
 "Mary, Don't You Weep" (Live, 1972) – with James Cleveland & The Southern California Community Choir
 "Climbing Higher Mountains" (Live, 1972) – with James Cleveland & The Southern California Community Choir
 "Precious Memories" (Live, 1972) – with James Cleveland & The Southern California Community Choir
 "Master of Eyes (The Deepness of Your Eyes)"
 "Angel"
 "Somewhere"
 "So Swell When You're Well"
 "I'm in Love"
 "Ain't Nothing Like the Real Thing"
 "Until You Come Back to Me (That's What I'm Gonna Do)"
 "Look Into Your Heart"
 "Sparkle"
 "Something He Can Feel"

Certifications

References

External links
 Rhino Records
 [ Credits]

Aretha Franklin compilation albums
1992 compilation albums